Capital is a department located in Salta Province, Argentina. It is the department of the provincial capital, the city of Salta, and the most populated one.

Geography 
Overview
The department is located in the middle of the province. It borders with the departments of La Caldera, General Güemes, Metán, La Viña, Chicoana, Cerrillos and Rosario de Lerma.

Towns and municipalities
Salta (535,060 inh.)
Villa San Lorenzo (4,915 inh.)

See also 
Tren a las Nubes
Salta–Antofagasta railway
Martín Miguel de Güemes International Airport

References

External links 

 Capital Department on Salta Province website

Departments of Salta Province